The 155th Street station is a local station on the IND Eighth Avenue Line of the New York City Subway. Located under the intersection of 155th Street and St. Nicholas Avenue, at the border of the Harlem and Washington Heights neighborhoods of Manhattan, it is served by the C train at all times except nights, when the A train takes over service.

History
The station opened on September 10, 1932, as part of the city-operated Independent Subway System (IND)'s initial segment, the Eighth Avenue Line between Chambers Street and 207th Street. While the IRT Broadway–Seventh Avenue Line already provided parallel service, the new Eighth Avenue subway via Central Park West and Frederick Douglass Boulevard provided an alternative route.

Station layout

This underground station has two local tracks with two side platforms. Two express tracks, used by the A train during daytime hours, run below the station and are not visible from the platforms.

The station once had a southern mezzanine with exits to 153rd Street, but it is now closed and used as a MTA New York City Transit facility. The north end at 155th Street has vent chambers and a high ceiling.

Like several other IND Eighth Avenue Line local stations, this station does not have a trim line, but does have mosaic name plates reading "155TH ST." in white sans-serif lettering on a yellow background with black border. Small tile captions reading "155" run along the wall at regular intervals between the name tablets, and beneath the name tablets are directional captions, all white lettering on a black background.

Exits
This station has pairs of staircases leading to the northwestern, northeastern, and southwestern corners of St. Nicholas Avenue and West 155th Street.

References

External links 

 
 Station Reporter — C Train
 The Subway Nut — 155th Street Pictures 
 155th Street southwestern corner entrance from Google Maps Street View
 Platforms from Google Maps Street View

1932 establishments in New York City
Hamilton Heights, Manhattan
IND Eighth Avenue Line stations
New York City Subway stations in Manhattan
Railway stations in the United States opened in 1932
Washington Heights, Manhattan